Replication factor C subunit 1 is a protein that in humans is encoded by the RFC1 gene.

Function 

The protein encoded by this gene is the large subunit of replication factor C, which is a five subunit DNA polymerase accessory protein. Replication factor C is a DNA-dependent ATPase that is required for eukaryotic DNA replication and repair. The protein acts as an activator of DNA polymerases, binds to the 3' end of primers, and promotes coordinated synthesis of both strands. It also may have a role in telomere stability.

Interactions 

RFC1 has been shown to interact with:
 BRD4, 
 HDAC1, 
 PCNA,
 RELA  and
 RFC3.

Clinical relevance 
Biallelic intronic repeat expansions (a series of repeating nucleotide sequences) in the replication factor C subunit 1 (RFC1) gene causes cerebellar ataxia, neuropathy and vestibular areflexia syndrome (CANVAS). Within the poly(A) tail of an AluSx3 element in RFC1, there are eleven repeats of the pentanucleotide "AAAAG". Repeat expansion and polymorphic configuration are observed in part of the population, with increased number of repeats associated to alternative "AAAGG", "AAGGG" and "ACAGG" pentanucleotides. In particular, biallelic "AAGGG" and "ACAGG" repeat expansion have disproportionately been observed in patients with CANVAS. Biallelic "AAGGG" repeat expansion is also reported in a high number of sporadic cases of late-onset ataxia, isolate sensory neuropathy and, less frequently, isolate cerebellar ataxia. Due to a diagnostic overlap with CANVAS, researchers have also investigated the presence of RFC1 expansions in pathologically confirmed multiple system atrophy (MSA) but found a similar alteration frequency (0.7%) to a healthy population, suggesting RFC1 does not have a role in this disease. 

Mutant biallelic intronic repeat expansions do not affect RFC1 expression in patient peripheral and brain tissue, suggesting no overt loss of function of this gene. 

In patients with the pathogenic RFC1 expansion, sensory neuropathy appears to be a predominant feature and patients may also present with symptoms such as cerebellar dysfunction, vestibular involvement and a dry spasmodic cough therefore, genetic testing is recommended in those with these symptoms.

References

Further reading